Alfred "Sigisfredo" Tonello (11 March 1929 – 21 December 1996) was a road racing cyclist from France, who won the bronze medal in the men's team road race at the 1952 Summer Olympics, alongside Jacques Anquetil and Claude Rouer. He was a professional rider from 1953 to 1959.

References

External links
 

1929 births
1996 deaths
French male cyclists
Cyclists at the 1952 Summer Olympics
Olympic cyclists of France
Olympic bronze medalists for France
Cyclists from Paris
Olympic medalists in cycling
Medalists at the 1952 Summer Olympics